"Hungry for Love" is a song and single by British band, Johnny Kidd & the Pirates. Written by Gordon Mills it was first released in the UK in 1963.

Background and chart success
It reached number 20 in the UK charts in 1963 and was in the charts for 10 weeks. It was their seventh UK chart success and their third highest placed single in the chart. The song was influenced by Merseybeat.

References 

1963 songs
1963 singles
Songs written by Gordon Mills
His Master's Voice singles